Dalembertia is a plant genus of the family Euphorbiaceae first described as a genus in 1858. It is native to Mexico and Guatemala.

Species
 Dalembertia hahniana Baill. - México State, Morelos, Michoacán
 Dalembertia platanoides Baill. - Oaxaca, Guerrero, México State
 Dalembertia populifolia Baill. - from Sonora to Oaxaca
 Dalembertia triangularis Müll.Arg. - Guatemala, Chiapas, Oaxaca

References

Euphorbiaceae genera
Hippomaneae
Taxa named by Henri Ernest Baillon